Sergio Járlaz (born 1 May 1985 in Santiago de Chile) is a Chilean singer. On 9 May 2011, he won the first ever series of Chilean edition of The X Factor broadcast on Chile's Televisión Nacional de Chile (TVN). He competed in "Over 25s" category and was mentored by judge Tito Beltrán. Stanley Weissohn became runner-up. As a reward, he will be signed to Sony Music and release an album.

Beginnings
He comes from a musical family who encouraged him to sing. After winning "Beca por Talento de Gratuidad Total", he earned a scholarship to go to an arts school where the director Patricio Prieto López gave him the name Pavarotti, encouraging him to study opera. At 14 he became main vocalist for the polyphonic choir of the Pentecostal Methodist Church of Maipú. After graduating at 18, he took part in a number of musical events in Chile and in other Latin American venues. In October 2007, he sang "Nessun Dorma" and the then mayor of Alberto Undurraga promised financial aid, and based upon that, he applied to the Faculty of Arts at the University of Chile, majoring in Classical Singing supervised by Chilean soprano Lucía Gana.

He released his own independent album Sueños in April 2009.

Participation in Chilean Factor X
In 2011, he applied to take part in the Chilean Factor X. He sang the following songs

He won the competition on 9 May 2011.

Discography

Albums
2009: Sueños

References

External links
Official Sergio Járlaz website

1985 births
Living people
The X Factor winners
21st-century Chilean male singers